Mikal Statham (born 25 April 1987), usually referred to by his self-penned nickname of "Oliver,"  is a tennis player from New Zealand.

Statham has a career high ATP singles ranking of 711 achieved on 12 April 2010. He also has a career high ATP doubles ranking of 381 achieved on 28 September 2009. He has represented New Zealand at the Davis Cup.

Statham made his ATP doubles main draw debut at the 2007 Heineken Open, partnering his twin brother Rubin.  He played two tournaments in Thailand in 2016, but had not otherwise competed since 2011 before returning to professional tournaments in 2018, when he played three ITF events.

Career

2019
Statham played exclusively in Cancún in 2019, competing in 16 tournaments from March to August.  His best efforts in singles were three second round losses, but he twice reached the semi-finals in doubles.

2020
Statham only played domestic competitions in 2020, including helping his Hikurangi team win the inaugural New Zealand Premier League.

Davis Cup (3)

   indicates the outcome of the Davis Cup match followed by the score, date, place of event, the zonal classification and its phase, and the court surface.

ATP Challenger and ITF Future finals

Singles: 1 (1 runner-up)

Doubles: 13 (3 titles, 10 runners-up)

References

External links

1987 births
Living people
New Zealand male tennis players